Elections are currently held every four years to elect the mayor of Knoxville, Tennessee.

Elections before 1987

1987

The 1987 Knoxville mayoral election took place on October and November of 1987 to elect the mayor of Knoxville, Tennessee. The election was held concurrently with various other local elections, and was officially nonpartisan. It saw the election of Victor Ashe.

Since no candidate secured a majority in the first round, a runoff election was held between the top-two finishers, with Ashe defeating former mayor Randy Tyree.

Results

First round

Runoff

1991

1995

1999

2003

The 2003 Knoxville mayoral election took place on September 30, 2003 to elect the mayor of Knoxville, Tennessee. The election was held concurrently with various other local elections; it was officially nonpartisan. It saw the election of Bill Haslam.

Haslam reached a majority in the initial round of the election, forgoing the needed for a runoff to be held.

Results

2007

The 2007 Knoxville mayoral election took place on September 25, 2007 to elect the mayor of Knoxville, Tennessee. The election was held concurrently with various other local elections; it was officially nonpartisan. It saw the reelection of incumbent Bill Haslam.

Haslam reached a majority in the initial round of the election, forgoing the needed for a runoff to be held.

Results

2011

The 2011 Knoxville mayoral election took place on September 27 and November 8, 2011 to elect the mayor of Knoxville, Tennessee. The election was held concurrently with various other local elections, and was officially nonpartisan. It saw the election of Madeline Rogero.

Serving as acting mayor, following the resignation of Republican mayor Bill Haslam to serve as Governor of Tennessee and in the months before the individual elected in this race would take office, was Daniel Brown, who did not seek a full term as mayor.

Since no candidate secured a majority in the first round, a runoff was held between the top-two finishers.

The election saw Rogero become the first woman elected mayor of Knoxville. She is also the first woman to be elected mayor in any of the "Big Four" cities of Tennessee (Memphis, Nashville, Knoxville and Chattanooga).

Results

First round

Runoff

2015

The 2015 Knoxville mayoral election took place on September 29, 2015 to elect the mayor of Knoxville, Tennessee. The election was held concurrently with various other local elections, and was officially nonpartisan. It saw the reelection of incumbent Madeline Rogero.

Since Rogero reached a majority in the initial round of the election, no runoff was held. This was set to be the case since only two candidates existed, counting qualified write-in 
Jack Knoxville, meaning that one of them would obtain a majority in the initial round.

Results

2019

The 2019 Knoxville mayoral Election took place on August 27, 2019 and November 5, 2019 to elect the next mayor of Knoxville, Tennessee. All Knoxville municipal elections are non-partisan.

Since no candidate met 50% or more of the votes, Eddie Mannis and Indya Kincannon advanced to the November election.

Incumbent Mayor Madeline Rogero was ineligible to run for re-election, having served the maximum of two terms.

Candidates 
Declared
 Michael Andrews, licensed barber
 Fletcher Burkhardt, social media specialist
 Indya Kincannon, former Knox County School Board member (2004–2014), former chair of the Knox County School Board, former city director for Mayor Rogero
 Eddie Mannis, former COO and deputy to Mayor Rogero, chairman of the Metropolitan Airport Authority, prominent businessman
 Calvin Taylor Skinner, worked in community and leadership development
 Marshall Stair, lawyer, at-large member of the Knoxville City Council (2011–2019)

Results

First round

Runoff
In the runoff election, Indya Kincannon defeated Eddie Mannis.

2023

The 2023 Knoxville mayoral election will be held on August 29, 2023, with any potential runoff scheduled for November 7, 2023. All Knoxville municipal elections are non-partisan.

Incumbent mayor Indya Kincannon announced she was running for re-election on November 16, 2022.

Candidates
Declared
 Indya Kincannon, incumbent mayor

References